Muriithi Kagai is the former director of microfinance lender Kosovo Enterprise Trust. He has also ran for governor of Kirinyaga County, Kenya, in 2013 and 2017.

References

Kenyan businesspeople
Kenyan politicians